The Bishop of Caithness was the ecclesiastical head of the Diocese of Caithness, one of Scotland's 13 medieval bishoprics. The first referenced bishop of Caithness was Aindréas, a Gael who appears in sources between 1146 and 1151 as bishop. Aindréas spent much if not all of his career outside his see.

Other bishops before Aindréas are possible, but none is documented. King David I of Scotland, is credited with founding many bishoprics, and it is possible that Caithness was one of them. Little documented history exists before the reign of King David.

The earliest bishops resided at Halkirk, with a castle at Scrabster. Bishop Gilbert de Moravia moved the episcopal seat to Dornoch in what is now Sutherland (then regarded as part of Caithness), and the bishopric remained at Dornoch Cathedral for the remainder of its existence. The Bishopric of Caithness' links with Rome ceased to exist after the Scottish Reformation, but the bishopric continued, saving temporary abolition between 1638 and 1661, under the episcopal Church of Scotland until the Revolution of 1688 led to the permanent abolition of episcopacy in the established church in Scotland (now Presbyterian in government) in 1689.

List of parishes 

 Assynt
 Bower
 Canisbay
 Clyne
 Creich
 Dornoch (Cathedral)
 Dunbeath
 Dunnet
 Durness
 Farr
 Halkirk
 Kildonan
 Kilmalie (later Golspie)
 Lairg
 Latheron
 Loth
 Olrig
 Reay
 Rogart
 Skinnet
 Thurso
 Watten
 Wick

List of Bishops

List of bishopric seats
Bishop's Palace, Halwick
Bishop's Palace, Scrabster
Bishop's Palace, Dornoch

References

 Broun, Dauvit, "The Seven Kingdoms in De Situ Albanie: A Record of Pictish political geography or imaginary Map of ancient Alba", in E.J. Cowan & R. Andrew McDonald (eds.), Alba: Celtic Scotland in the Medieval Era, (Edinburgh, 2000, rev. 2005).
 Crawford, Barbara, "The Earldom of Caithness and the Kingdom of Scotland, 1150-1266" in Keith Stringer (ed.), Essays on the Nobility of Medieval Scotland, (Edinburgh, 1985), pp. 25-43
 Dowden, John, The Bishops of Scotland, ed. J. Maitland Thomson, (Glasgow, 1912)
 Jackson, Kenneth H. (ed), The Gaelic Notes in the Book of Deer, (Cambridge, 1972)
 Keith, Robert, An Historical Catalogue of the Scottish Bishops: Down to the Year 1688, (London, 1924) 
 Lawrie, Sir Archibald, Early Scottish Charters Prior to A.D. 1153, (Glasgow, 1905)
 Watt, D.E.R., Fasti Ecclesiae Scoticanae Medii Aevi ad annum 1638, 2nd Draft, (St Andrews, 1969)

 
1689 disestablishments in Scotland